This article contains the rank insignia of the Royal Hellenic Air Force (until 1973).

Officer ranks

Other ranks

See also
Hellenic Air Force
Greek military ranks
Military of Greece
Hellenic Army
Hellenic Army officer rank insignia
Hellenic Army enlisted rank insignia
Hellenic Navy
Comparative officer ranks of World War II

Notes

References

Military ranks of Greece
Hellenic Air Force